is a Japanese sect of Shingon Buddhism. Headquartered on Mount Kōya in Wakayama Prefecture, it is also the oldest and largest of the eighteen Shingon sects in Japan. The main temple is Kongōbu-ji.

Schools of Shingon Buddhism